Gianelli is a surname. Notable people with the surname include:

Carlos Gianelli (born 1948), Uruguayan lawyer and diplomat
John Gianelli (born 1950), American basketball player
William Gianelli (born 1919), United States Army personnel

See also
21588 Gianelli, main-belt asteroid
Gianelli Power Plant, power plant in California.